Khaled Kassab (born 1 January 1992 in Aleppo, Syria) is a Syrian footballer. He currently plays for Al-Sulaymaniyah in Iraq.

He started his in career in the youth academy of Al-Ittihad, but he never made it to the first team. He joined Iraqi second tier Salahaddin in the 2012-2013 season, after an impressive season he signed for Karbalaa in October, 2013.

References

External links
 

1992 births
Living people
Syrian footballers
Syrian expatriate footballers
Expatriate footballers in Iraq
Syrian expatriate sportspeople in Iraq
Association football defenders
Sportspeople from Aleppo